Gerhard Klingenberg, real name Gerhard Schwabenitzky (born 11 May 1929 in Vienna) is an Austrian actor, theatre director and theater manager.

Filmography 

 Was wäre, wenn...? (East Germany, 1959)
 Kabale und Liebe (West Germany, 1967, based on Intrigue and Love, TV film)
  (West Germany, 1968, based on Death of a Salesman, TV film), with Heinz Rühmann
 Kabale und Liebe (West Germany, 1976, based on Intrigue and Love, TV film), with Klaus Maria Brandauer 
  (West Germany, 1978, based on The Bat, TV film)

References

External links 
 
 
 Gerhard Klingenberg on ZVAB

1929 births
Living people
Male actors from Vienna
Austrian theatre directors
Recipients of the Austrian Cross of Honour for Science and Art, 1st class
Theatre people from Vienna